Chalcosyrphus flexus  is a species of syrphid fly in the family Syrphidae.

Distribution
United States.

References

Eristalinae
Diptera of North America
Insects described in 1941
Taxa named by Charles Howard Curran